For information on all San Diego State University sports, see San Diego State Aztecs
The San Diego State Aztecs baseball team is the college baseball program that represents San Diego State University in the National Collegiate Athletic Association (NCAA)'s Division I. Along with the majority of the university's other athletic teams, the baseball team became a member of the Mountain West Conference during the 1999–00 academic year.  Previously, they competed in the Western Athletic Conference. The Aztecs play their home games at Tony Gwynn Stadium on the SDSU campus in San Diego, California. The team was coached by Tony Gwynn himself (who played for the SDSU baseball and men's basketball teams as a student) from 2003 until his death in 2014.

Tony Gwynn Stadium

The previous stadium at the same site was known as Smith Stadium in honor of Charlie Smith, the longtime San Diego State head baseball coach. In 1997, the stadium was rebuilt at a cost of $4 million, funded mainly by John Moores, then-owner of the San Diego Padres. The new stadium was named in honor of Tony Gwynn, a Baseball Hall of Fame superstar for the Padres. The playing field retained Smith's name, and is officially known as Charlie Smith Field at Tony Gwynn Stadium. As an undergraduate, Gwynn played both baseball and basketball for the Aztecs. He became SDSU's head baseball coach after he retired from the Padres.

Head coaches
As of the 2020 Baseball Season

Through May 25, 2019.

SDSU in the NCAA tournament
The NCAA Division I baseball tournament started in 1947. San Diego State athletics joined Division I in 1970.
The format of the tournament has changed through the years.

All-time series records
As of the 2019 Media Guide

Mountain West members

Through May 25, 2019.
Source:
Note all-time series includes non-conference matchups.

Player awards

All-Americans 
The following is a listing of first team selections. Other selections are available at SDSU's official media guide.

1980
Tony Gwynn (OF) - ABCA
1984
Chris Gwynn (OF) - BA
1985
Chris Gwynn (OF) - SN
1995
Travis Lee (1B) - BA
1996
Travis Lee (1B) - ABCA, BA & SN
2008
Stephen Strasburg (P) - BA, CB & NCBWA
2009
Stephen Strasburg (P) - ABCA, BA, CA & NCBWA
Addison Reed (P) - ABCA, CB & NCBWA
2014
Michael Cederoth (P) - CB

Legend:
ABCA = American Baseball Coaches Association
BA = Baseball America
CB = Collegiate Baseball
NCBWA = National Collegiate Baseball Writers Association
SN = Sporting News

Alumni in Major League Baseball (MLB)
Dozens of Aztec baseball players have reached Major League Baseball (MLB) and played in regular season games. Through 2020, Aztec baseball alumni have a combined 37 MLB All-Star Game selections, 14 Gold Glove Awards, 9 World Series championships, and 3 No-hitters pitched (includes one combined no-hitter).

See also
List of NCAA Division I baseball programs

References

External links